The Sri Lanka cricket team toured England in the 1984 season to play a one-match Test series against England. The only match was drawn.

Test series summary

References
 CricketArchive – tour itineraries

Annual reviews
 Playfair Cricket Annual 1985
 Wisden Cricketers' Almanack 1985

1984 in cricket
1984 in English cricket
1984
International cricket competitions from 1980–81 to 1985
1984 in Sri Lankan cricket
August 1984 sports events in the United Kingdom